Universitas Katolik Soegijapranata (Unika) or Soegijapranata Catholic University (SCU) is a leading Catholic institution with an institutional accreditation of A. It is located in the city of Semarang, Central Java and under the auspices of the Sandjojo Foundation which is affiliated with Archdiocese of Semarang. The university is a continuation of the Indonesian Catholic University of Atmajaya Semarang Branch, which was born in 1964 and later changed its name into the Semarang Catholic Institute of Technology (I.T.K.S.) in 1973. On August 5, 1982 with the Decree of the Minister of Education and Culture of the Republic of Indonesia dated September 24, 1983 Number 0400/0/1983, I.T.K.S. changed its name into Soegijapranata Catholic University.

Soegijapanata Catholic University is one of the best private universities in Indonesia that upholds the motto: "Talent Pro Patria et Humanitate" (the best talent is dedicated to the nation-state and humanity). The university has an extensive overseas and domestic cooperation network.

History
At its inception, Soegijapranata Catholic University (SCU), located on Jl. Pandanaran 100, Semarang consists of three faculties namely Faculty of Engineering,  Faculty of Law, and Faculty of Economics. In line with the development of the University, since mid-1990s all SCU’s activities have been centered on the Bendan Dhuwur Campus and until now the Bendhan Dhuwur Campus has become the center of the university's academic activities.

The name "Soegijapranata" is adapted from the name Mgr. Alb. Soegijapranata, SJ, a priest and the first native Archbishop who became Indonesia’s national hero and figure. Soegijapranata was born in Surakarta, November 25, 1896. He entered the novices of the Society of Jesus in Mariendaal, Grave, the Netherlands on September 27, 1920. He was ordained as a Priest on August 15, 1931 and as an Archbishop of Semarang on September 20, 1940. His struggle and attention in the world of education is the legacy of his lecturer, Father Frans van Lith, SJ. One of his efforts to improve education was to help increase the quality of two oldest Catholic universities, Parahyangan Catholic University, Bandung, and Sanata Dharma University, Yogyakarta, that were of equal status with the state universities. Taking the life story of Mgr. Albertus Soegijapranata, a movie entitled “Soegija” was appointed to the big screen in 2012. This movie was directed by Garin Nugroho and received a very good response where more than 500,000 spectators watched this movie in theaters throughout Indonesia.

Through the name "Soegijapranata", Soegijapranata Catholic University wishes to continue the spirit, the struggles and the ideals of Mgr. Alb. Soegijapranata, SJ.

Education programs
Up until now, Soegijapranata Catholic University manages 21 undergraduate study programs, a diploma program, 8 master programs, and a doctoral program.

Undergraduate program
 Faculty of Architecture & Design
 Architecture - Undergraduate Program
 Visual Communication Design - Undergraduate Program
 Faculty of Engineering
 Civil Engineering - Undergraduate Program
 Electrical Engineering - Undergraduate Program
 Energy Technology - Undergraduate Program
 Faculty of Law and Communication
 Law - Undergraduate Program
 Communication Science - Undergraduate Program
 Economics and Business Faculty
 Management - Undergraduate Program
 Accounting - Undergraduate Program
 Taxation – Diploma Program
 Digital Accounting - Undergraduate Program
 Faculty of Psychology
 Psychology - Undergraduate Program
 Computer Science Faculty
 Informatics Engineering - Undergraduate Program
 Information Systems - Undergraduate Program
 Game Technology - Undergraduate Program
 E-Commerce - Undergraduate Program
 Artificial Intelligence & Big Data Analytics - Undergraduate Program
 Faculty of Agricultural Technology
 Food Technology - Undergraduate Program
 Nutrition and Culinary Technology - Undergraduate Program
 Faculty of Language and Art
 English Literature - Undergraduate Program
 Englishpreneurship - Undergraduate Program
 Digital Performing Arts - Undergraduate Program
 Faculty
 Infrastructure and Environmental Engineering - Undergraduate Program
 Faculty
 Bachelor of Medicine and Professional Doctors - Undergraduate Program

Postgraduate program
 Masters of Environment and Urban (M.Sc.) -  Postgraduate Program
 Master of Science in Psychology (M.Sc.) - Postgraduate Program
 Master of Professional Psychology (M.Psi.) - Postgraduate Program
 Master of Law (M.H) concentration in Health Law - Postgraduate Program
 Master of Management (M.M.) - Postgraduate Program
 Master of Accounting (M.Ak) - Postgraduate Program
 Master of Architecture (M.Ars.) - Postgraduate Program
 Master of Food Technology (M.TP) - Postgraduate Program

Doctoral program
 Doctor of Environmental Sciences (Dr)
 Doctor of Digital Architecture (Dr)

International cooperation
As one of the leading universities in Indonesia, international cooperation is also woven by the Soegijapranata Catholic University with the best educational institutions in all corners of the world. Collaborations include: memorandum of understanding, student and faculty exchanges, scholarships, value sharing, and international conference participation. In addition, SCU involvement in several network of international universities e.g. ASEACCU (Association of South East and East Asia Catholic Colleges and Universities) and ACUCA (Association of Christian Universities and Colleges in Asia) further expands the university's affiliations so that programs such as student/staff exchange and international conferences become a mandatory agenda in each semester.
 Netherlands: Vrije University of Amsterdam, Radboud University, Wageningen University
 United States: Youngstown State University Ohio, Bowling Green State University Ohio
 Germany: Leibniz University Hannover
 Italy: Universita Della Callabria
 Taiwan: Tunghai University, Providence University, Fu Jen Catholic University, Wenzao Ursuline University of Languages, Chang Jung Christian University, Soochow University
 South Korea: Namseoul University, Hanyang University, Catholic University of Korea, Soongsil University, Ewha Womans University, Handong Global University
 Japan: Sophia University, International Christian University
 Vietnam: FPT University
 Singapore: National University of Singapore
 Malaysia: Cyberjaya University College of Medical Sciences
 China: Guangxi Normal University
 Thailand: Assumption University of Bangkok, Mahidol University
 Philippines: De La Salle University-Dasmarinas, San Beda College, University of San Carlos, Ateneo de Davao University, Miriam College, Ateneo de Manila University
 East Timor: Dili Institute of Technology

Student activity units
The Soegijapranata Catholic University has various kinds of Student Activity Units (UKM) which serve as a place for self-actualization of its students. By following UKM, students will not only get quality soft skills, but also organizational skills and self-control that are very useful for the careers of students in the future.
Below are list of Student Activity Units owned by Soegijapranata Catholic University, Semarang.
 Sports: Basketball, Football, Tennis, Badminton, Futsal
 Art: Choir (Gratia Choir and Gratia Voice), Dance
 Entrepreneurship: Soegijapranata Student Cooperative (KOPMA) with an integrated Student Business Center
 Hobbies: Bridge, Soegijapranata English Debate Club
 Pastoral and Counseling Services: Campus Ministry and Peer Educator
 Martial Arts: Karate, Capoiera
 Soegijapranata Echo Life (SEL): is a student activity unit that likes to recycle used goods
 Student Press Institute (Paraga),
 Voluntary Corps (KSR),
 Soepra Radio and Television
 Racana Soegijapranata (Scouts)

Notable alumni
 Hendrar Prihadi (Mayor of Semarang 2013-2015 and 2015-2020)
 Dea Goesti Riskita Koswara (Runner-up 3 and Miss Grand International Indonesia)
Mandy Adriani Tutuarima (1st Runner-up Putri Indonesia 2000)

Achievement

In 2008, the Soegijapranata Catholic University (SCU) got the "B" result for Institutional Accreditation based on Decree No. 050/BAN-PT/Ak-I/Inst/IV/2008 dated April 12, 2008. In 2013, the Soegijapranata Catholic University (SCU)got the "B" result for Institutional Accreditation based on Decree (SK) Number 063/SK/BAN-PT/Ak-IV/PT/II/2013 dated February 21, 2013 In 2015, Soegijapranata Catholic University (SCU) was ranked as the 10th best private university (PTS) and ranked 39th in all universities throughout the Ministry of Research Technology version of Higher Education (Kemenristek Dikti), Indonesia.

In 2017, Soegijapranata Catholic University (SCU) got the results of "A" for Institutional Accreditation based on Decree No.0384/SK/BAN-PT/Akred/PT/I/2017 dated January 26, 2017 which is valid until January 26, 2022.
The achievements of the Soegijapranata Catholic University of Higher Education Institution Accreditation (AIPT) as a benchmark for the quality of higher education were started by the National Higher Education Accreditation Board (BAN-PT) since 2007. Soegijapranata Catholic University (SCU)  which is one of 50 Promising Universities in Indonesia was chosen to start this accreditation, as a pilot project of the BAN-PT Institution Accreditation which was not yet required. As a result, Soegijapranata Catholic University (SCU) obtained the "B" accreditation for the first time based on Decree Number 050/BAN-PT/Ak-I/Inst/IV/2008 dated April 10, 2008. Subsequently in 2013, Soegijapranata Catholic University (SCU) maintained the results of "B" for re- Institutional accreditation based on Decree (SK) Number 063/SK /BAN-PT/Ak-IV/PT/II/2013.

In 2016, Soegijapranata Catholic University (SCU)  again applied for the third re-accreditation of the Institution and got the "A" result for Institutional Accreditation in 2017 based on Decree No. 0384/SK/BAN-PT/Akred/PT/I/2017 dated January 26, 2017 which is valid until January 26, 2022. This result is inseparable from the participation of the academic community of Soegijapranata Catholic University (SCU) and the community in building this campus.
Previously, in 2014 Soegijapranata Catholic University (SCU) received an award to enter the Main Research cluster of the Ministry of Research Technology for Higher Education (Kemenristek Dikti).
Furthermore, in 2015 Soegijapranata Catholic University (SCU) was ranked as the 10th best private university (PTS) nationally and ranked 39th in all universities throughout Indonesia, the Ministry of Research Technology version of Higher Education (Kemenristek Dikti).
At the end of 2015, Soegijapranata Catholic University (SCU) again received an award through the library with the receipt of the results of A accreditation from the National Library.
Whereas in 2016, Soegijapranata Catholic University (SCU) was trusted by the Ministry of Research, Technology and Higher Education to be one of 40 universities in Indonesia that held the Professional Engineer Program (PPI).
In 2017 the Ministry of Research, Technology and Higher Education (Ministry of Research and Technology and Higher Education) established 26 state and private universities that were accredited A, becoming foster colleges for dozens of private universities that were accredited C.
Then in 2018, Unika Soegijapranata was ranked as the 8th best private university (PTS) nationally and ranked 39th in all universities throughout Indonesia in the version of the Ministry of Research Technology of Higher Education (Kemenristek Dikti).

Rector

References

External links
 

Buildings and structures in Semarang
U
Universities in Indonesia
Association of Christian Universities and Colleges in Asia
Universities in Central Java
Private universities and colleges in Indonesia
Semarang